The Leones de León is a professional baseball team competing in the Nicaragua Professional Baseball League and the Nicaraguan baseball 1st division (Campeonato Nacional de Béisbol Superior de Nicaragua - GPO).

Their home games are played at Estadio Héroes y Mártires de Septiembre in León, Nicaragua. Their biggest rival is Indios del Bóer.

The Leones de Leon won the 2019 Latin American Baseball Series, which is the other counterpart of Serie Del Caribe, in a Final Game against the champion team of Mexico.

Championships in LBPN

Championships in Campeonato Nacional de Béisbol Superior (Germán Pomares Ordoñez)

Championships in Serie Latinoamericana

References

Nicaraguan Professional Baseball League